The first treatise on Telugu grammar ( vyākaraṇam), the Andhra Sabda Chintamani (Telugu: ఆంధ్ర శబ్ద చింతామణి Āndhra śabda cintāmaṇi) was written in Sanskrit by Nannayya, who is considered the first poet (ādikavi) and grammarian of the Telugu language, in the 11th century CE. After Nannayya, Atharvana and Ahobala composed the sutras, the vartikas and the bhashyam.

In the 19th century, Paravastu Chinnaya Suri wrote a simplified work on Telugu grammar called Bāla Vyākaraṇam (lit. Children's grammar), borrowing concepts and ideas from Nannayya, in Telugu.

According to Nannayya, language without 'Niyama' or the language which does not adhere to Vyākaranam is called Grāmya (lit of the village) or Apabhraṃśa, is unfit for literary usage. All literary texts in Telugu follow the Vyākaraṇam.

Inflection
Telugu is more inflected than other literary Dravidian languages. Telugu nouns are inflected for number (singular, plural), gender (masculine and non-masculine) and grammatical case (nominative, accusative, instrumental, dative, ablative, genitive, locative, and vocative).

Gender
Telugu has three genders:
 masculine (purusha liṅgamu),
 feminine (strī liṅgamu),
 neuter (napunsaka liṅgamu).

In Telugu the occurrence of the suffix (–ḍu) almost always encodes masculine gender. For example: 
 tammuḍu (younger brother),
 mukhyuḍu (important man),
 Rāmuḍu (Rāma),
 nāyakuḍu (leader).

However, there are nouns that do not end in (-ḍu) that belong to the masculine class.For example: 
 annayya (elder brother), 
 māmayya (uncle).

Most of the words ending in -ḍu are borrowings from Sanskrit words ending in -a, and therefore the feminine forms of these words are equivalent to the Sanskrit words.

Sometimes, a word ending in -ḍu is feminized by adding the suffix -ālu to the root. The -a ending of the root becomes -ur. This phenomenon is known as the rugāgama sandhi.

Neuter-gendered words usually contain the suffix -amu. This suffix descends from the Old Telugu suffix -ambu and is increasingly losing the final -u to become -aṁ. These neuter words are often borrowed from Sanskrit neuter-gendered words ending in -a, -am, -i, or -u. The final -a usually becomes -amu, and the final -u becomes -uvu. 

However, Telugu sometimes uses the same forms for singular feminine and neuter genders – the third person pronoun (అది ) is used to refer to animals and objects.

Number (vachanam)

Anything with quantity one is singular (ekavachanam).
Anything more than one in number is called plural (bahuvachanam), as in English.

In Telugu the plural is also used to as an honorific. Some nouns are always plural and some are always singular. For example, water (neellu) is always plural.

God (bhagavantudu), sun (suryudu), earth (bhūmi), and moon (chandrudu) are always singular form.

Case (విభక్తి vibhakti)
Telugu has eight cases.

Word order
Telugu word order is relatively free, and nouns are inflected for case. However, the
most common word order tends to be SOV (subject–object–verb).

Punctuation
Telugu uses single and double vertical bars to indicate a comma and a full stop.

Sandhi or joining
Sandhi is the fusion of sounds across word boundaries and the alteration of sounds due to neighboring sounds or due to the grammatical function of adjacent words.

Telugu sandhis can be divided into native ones and those derived from Sanskrit ones.

Sanskrit Sandhis 
These sandhis usually take place when the two words undergoing Sandhi are words borrowed from Sanskrit.

Savarṇadīrghasandhi (Vowel lengthening)
The savarṇadīrgha sandhi, from Sanskrit savarṇa 'same sound' and dīrgha '''long', this sandhi takes place when the first word ends in the same vowel that the second word starts with. The two vowels join to form one long vowel. 

 Guṇasandhi (Vowel raising) 
The guṇasandhi takes place when a word final -a is followed by either -i, -u or -r̥. The sandhi yields -ē, -ō and -ar respectively. -ē, -ō and -ar are collectively called the guṇas, hence the name.

 Vr̥ddhisandhi (Diphthongization) 
The vr̥ddhisandhi, from Sanskrit vr̥ddhi-, 'growth', takes place when a word final -a is followed by -ē or -ai, -ō or -au, and -ar or -ār, and yields -ai, -au and -ār respectively. -ai, -au and -ār are collectively called the vr̥ddhis, hence the name.

 Yaṇādēśasandhi (Glide insertion) 
The yaṇādēśasandhi takes place when word final -i, -u or -r̥ is followed by a non-similar vowel. The sandhi yields either -y-, -v- or -r- respectively. These are known as the yaṇās.

 Native sandhis 
These sandhis usually occur when one or both of the words is a native Telugu word, or is a Sanskrit borrowing that is treated as such (ex. iṣṭamu).

 Akārasandhi (Elision of a) 
This sandhi occurs when a word final -a is followed by any vowel. The word final -a is removed, and the following vowel takes its place.

 Ikārasandhi 
This sandhi occurs when a word final -i is followed by any vowel. The word final -i is removed, and the following vowel takes its place.

 Ukārasandhi 
This sandhi occurs when a word final -u is followed by any vowel. The word final -u is removed, and the following vowel takes its place.

 Trikasandhi 
One of the most complicated of the sandhis, the trikasandhi is of two forms:

 When a final -ā -ī or -ē is followed by a non-clustered consonant, the vowel is shortened, and the unclustered consonant is geminated.
 When the word mūḍu (three) is followed by a consonant, the word-final -ḍu is eliminated. This triggers the first rule of the trikasandhi, and the now-word-final -ū is shortened, and the following consonant is geminated. When the consonant is l-, sometimes it is geminated to -ḷḷ- instead.

 Āmrēḍitasandhi 
This sandhi deals with repeated words, i.e., pairs of same words. This sandhi forms some of the most used irregular-looking words in the language. It has three rules:

 When a vowel-initial word is repeated, the final vowel of the first word is eliminated.
 Word final forms of ka (ka, ki, ku, ke, etc.) of the first word are eliminated and the first rule is applied.
 The andādi words (anduku, iggulu, tumuru, tuniyalu, etc.) when compounded lead to irregular forms.

 Dviruktaṭakārasandhi 
Sometimes regarded as a form of the āmrēḍitasandhi, the dviruktaṭakārasandhi occurs when kaḍādi (kaḍa, naḍuma, madhyāhnamu, bayalu, etc.) words are compounded. A dviruktaṭakāra, a geminated -ṭṭ- forms from this sandhi, hence the name.

 Gasaḍadavādēśasandhi 

Trika Sandhi.
 Dugagama Sandhi.
 Saraladesha Sandhi
 Gasadadavadesha Sandhi.
 Rugagama Sandhi.
 Yadagama Sandhi.
 Prathametara Vibhakti Sandhi.
 Uchadadi sandhi.

Samasam or nominal compounds
Samasam or samasa occurs with various structures, but morphologically speaking they are essentially the same: each noun (or adjective) is in its (weak) stem form, with only the final element receiving case inflection.

Some of the Telugu samasams are:
 Tatpuruṣa Samasam.
 Prathama tatpurusha samasam Dvitiya tatpurusha samasam Trutiya tatpurusha samasam Chaturthi tatpurusha samasam Panchami tatpurusha samasam Shashti tatpurusha samasam Saptami tatpurusha samasam Nai tatpurusha samasam Karmadhāraya Samasam.
 Viśeshana purwapada karmadharaya samasam Viśeshana uttarapada karmadharaya samasam Viśeshana ubhayapada karmadharaya samasam Upamana purvapada karmadharaya samasam Upamana uttarapada karmadharaya samasam Avadharana purvapada karmadharaya samasam Sambhavana purvapada karmadharaya samasam Dvigu Samasam.
 Dvandva Samasam.
 Bahuvrīhi Samasam.
 Amredita Samasam.
 Avyayībhāva Samasam

 Alankaram or ornamentation 

Telugu Alankaram is a figure of speech which means ornaments or embellishments which are used to enhance the beauty of the poems. There are two types of Alankarams, 'Shabdalankaram' which primarily focuses on Sound and 'Arthalamkaram' which focuses on meaning. These two alankarams are further broken down in to different categories.  
shabdalankaras are 6 types where as there are nearly 30 to 40 types in ardhalankaras.
 Shabdalankaram Vruttyanuprasa Chekanuprasa Latanuprasa antyanuprasa Yamakam Mukta pada grastam Arthalamkaram Upamanaalankaram Utprekshaalankaram Rupakaalankaram Shleshalankaram Arthantaranyaasam Atishayokti Drushtantam Swabhavokti vyajastu virodhi vishamamu parikaramu branti madala kramalam''

Chandassu or Telugu prosody 

Metrical poetry in Telugu is called 'Chandassu' or 'Chandas'. ya-maa-taa-raa-ja-bhaa-na-sa-la-gam is called the chandassu chakram. Utpalamala, Champakamala, Mattebha vikreeditham, Sardoola Vikreeditham, Kanda, Aata veladi, Theta geethi, Sragdhara, Bhujangaprayata, etc. are some metrics used in Telugu poetry.

Prakruti and Vikruti
Telugu has many Tatsama words. They are called Prakruti, which are equivalent to Sanskrit words. The equivalent colloquial words are called Vikruti, which means distorted. However, Prakruti is only used as a medium of instruction in educational institutions, offices etc.
For example:

Verbs

See also
 Telugu language
 Telugu literature
 Telugu people
 Telugu development
 Satavahana Dynasty
 Sanskrit grammar
 Sanskrit pronouns and determiners

References

 

Telugu language
Dravidian grammars